Renato Cosentino (16 November 1909 – 14 June 1996) was an Italian sailor. He competed in the mixed 6 metres at the 1936 and 1948 Summer Olympics.

References

1909 births
1996 deaths
Sportspeople from Naples
Olympic sailors of Italy
Sailors at the 1936 Summer Olympics – 6 Metre
Sailors at the 1948 Summer Olympics – 6 Metre
Italian male sailors (sport)